The surname Laughlin is an Anglicised form of the Irish Ó Lochlainn meaning "descendant of Lochlann".

Surname
Ben Laughlin (disambiguation)
Bill Laughlin (1915–1993), American professional basketball player
Billy Laughlin (1932–1948), American child actor
Charles Laughlin (born 1938), American neuroanthropologist
Craig Laughlin (born 1957), Canadian ice hockey player
Don Laughlin (born 1931), American casino entrepreneur
Edward E. Laughlin (1887–1952), American lawyer and politician
Harry H. Laughlin (1880–1943), American eugenicist
Homer Laughlin (1843–1913), American businessman and potter
James Laughlin (1914–1997), American poet
James Laughlin (industrialist) (1806–1882), American banker and financier
James Laurence Laughlin (1850–1933), American economist
John Laughlin (disambiguation)
Nicholas Laughlin (born 1975), Trinidadian editor and writer
Robert B. Laughlin (born 1950), American physicist
Simon Laughlin, British neurobiologist, on the Committee of the Rank Prize for Optoelectronics
Tom Laughlin (1931–2013), American actor
Tom Laughlin (born 1971), American professional wrestler better known as Tommy Dreamer
William S. Laughlin (1919–2001), American anthropologist
Zoe Laughlin, British artist, maker and materials engineer

Given name
Laughlin Phillips (1924–2010), American museum director

See also
McLaughlin (surname)

References

Anglicised Irish-language surnames
Surnames of Irish origin